"Wind It Up" is a song by American singer and songwriter Gwen Stefani. Originally written for inclusion on Stefani's Harajuku Lovers Tour, the song was later recorded for her second solo studio album, The Sweet Escape (2006). The track contains an interpolation of the song "The Lonely Goatherd" from the Trapp Family-inspired musical The Sound of Music.

"Wind It Up" was received unfavorably by most music critics, who criticized the song's use of yodeling and found the track to be over the top. It was released as the album's lead single on October 30, 2006, and reached the top 20 in many music markets. The accompanying music video, which became popular on stations such as Total Request Live, was directed by Sophie Muller and takes influence from The Sound of Music.

Background and writing
In July 2005, Stefani began writing and recording material with Pharrell Williams in Miami, Florida. During one of their sessions, they penned "Wind It Up" for a September 2005 fashion show revealing the 2006 collection of Stefani's fashion line L.A.M.B.

Stefani asked DJ Jeremy Healy to create a mashup of the song and "The Lonely Goatherd", a song from the 1959 Rodgers and Hammerstein musical and 1965 film The Sound of Music. Stefani considered The Sound of Music her favorite film, and she had wanted to incorporate a beat to one of its songs all her life. Stefani commented, "I literally cried, and I'm not exaggerating, when I heard the mash-up." Williams, however, did not like the addition of yodeling and The Sound of Music to the track. Although, Williams later admitted on The Late Late Show with James Corden (coincidentally also appearing with Stefani) that he "came around" because "the magic in it was kinda like her being lit up about it" and "it's her song."

The lyrics are not narrative, and Stefani stated, "A song like 'Wind It Up' isn't about anything." In the song, Stefani discusses how boys watch girls dance. The song includes a reference to Stefani's fashion line, with Stefani going, "They like the way that L.A.M.B. is going 'cross my shirt".

Critical reception
"Wind It Up" received mostly negative reviews by contemporary pop music critics. Entertainment Weeklys Michael Slezak found the bassline "rubbery" and criticized the song for lacking a melody as well as its reference to Stefani's own clothing line. Stephen Thomas Erlewine of AllMusic stated that the Neptunes had forced the sampling "into one of their typical minimalist tracks, over which Gwen spouts off clumsy material-minded lyrics touting her fashion line and her shape". Bill Lamb of About.com rated the song three and a half stars, giving it "high marks for entertainment value", but commented that it sounded like a retread of "Rich Girl" from Stefani's debut album Love. Angel. Music. Baby. Charles Merwin of Stylus Magazine was mixed on the track, writing that "it's preventing something far less interesting from getting played." John Murphy from musicOMH panned the track as "just horrible, and possibly the worst start to an album this year". Spence D. from IGN characterized the song as "a bugged out Sound of Music bhangra blitz that sounds like part M.I.A. and part Julie Andrews".

Many criticized the inclusion of yodeling and "The Lonely Goatherd" sample. In a review for Rolling Stone, Rob Sheffield called the track "yodel-trocious" and argued that "the problem isn't the Swiss Miss motif so much as the fourth-rate Neptunes track". Caroline Sullivan of The Guardian was pleased with the track, describing the yodeling as "off-her-head", and referred to the track as "a pinnacle of madness". IndieLondon's Jack Foley noted "Wind It Up" as a highlight of The Sweet Escape and called it "Stefani's gift that she can take something that, on paper, sounds cheesy and make it utterly, utterly cool." USA Todays Ken Barnes, however, found the track "campy" and "a tacky attempt at sexiness", adding that the combination of yodeling and the interpolation was "awkward". Alex Miller of the NME also found the song campy, commenting that its "dumb sexual bravado has all the sophistication of a teenage boy's wet dream", and compared the yodeling, interpolation, and "erotic rap" to "a trench foot which screams for amputation from the tracklisting".

Commercial performance
"Wind It Up" debuted on the US Billboard Hot 100 at number 40 on the issue dated November 18, 2006, becoming Stefani's highest debut on the chart, both solo and as a member of No Doubt. It peaked four weeks later at number six and remained on the chart for 18 weeks. It peaked at number seven on the Pop 100 chart, but was less successful on the Pop 100 Airplay chart, only reaching number 19. The single performed well in clubs, reaching number five on the Hot Dance Club Play chart, and peaked at number 18 on the Mainstream Top 40 chart.

"Wind It Up" met similar success in Europe, reaching number five on the European Hot 100 Singles. The single debuted at number eight on the UK Singles Chart, selling 10,381 downloads in its first week. The following week, it rose to number three (behind Take That's "Patience" and Cliff Richard's "21st Century Christmas") with 17,706 copies sold, earning Stefani her second highest-peaking single in the United Kingdom after "The Sweet Escape". It had less success across the continent, reaching the top 10 in Belgium, the Czech Republic, Finland, Ireland, Italy, the Netherlands, and Norway, and the top 20 in Austria, France, Sweden, and Switzerland.

The song was generally successful elsewhere. In Australia, "Wind It Up" debuted at number eight on the ARIA Singles Chart and spent its first seven weeks within the top 10. It peaked at number five in its fifth week on the run, spending 19 weeks on the chart, and was certified gold by the Australian Recording Industry Association (ARIA). The track topped the New Zealand Singles Chart in its third and fourth week, and stayed on the chart for 20 weeks altogether. Three years later, on March 14, 2010, the Recording Industry Association of New Zealand (RIANZ) certified "Wind It Up" gold.

Music video

The song's music video was directed by Sophie Muller and shot in two days on October 30–31, 2006. Although it does not follow a substantial plot, it features outfits and scenes inspired by The Sound of Music. Stefani and her Harajuku Girls are often dancing in front of fields of flowers and a background of key-like symbols composed of two G's placed back to back. In a scene mimicking The Sound of Music, Stefani portrays Maria von Trapp while the dancers, dressed in pajamas, portray her children and jump on a bed. In another scene, Stefani uses curtains to create sailor suits for the Harajuku Girls. Stefani also appears as a nun and an orchestra conductor. One scene uses smoke to create the illusion that Stefani is a submerged escape artist searching for a key. She pulls the key, a symbol of "the sweet escape", from her mouth as an allusion to performances by escapologist Harry Houdini. The song's title is often visualized by a colorful sign that reads "wind it up". Another video was produced in 3-D, but this version was never released. After seeing the video, Jimmy Iovine, co-founder of Interscope Records, decided to work with James Cameron to produce other 3-D music presentations.

The video was successful on music video television programs. "Wind It Up" first aired on November 10, 2006, on MTV and the same day it premiered online on MTV Overdrive. Two days later, on November 13, 2006, "Wind It Up" premiered on the station's top-10 chart program Total Request Live. The video debuted at number eight on the countdown and reached a peak at number two. After its November 17 debut on MuchMusic's Countdown, it reached number two for the week of January 26, 2007. In a review of the music video, The Guardians Anna Pickard poked fun at the number of personas that appear in the video, referring to some of them as "Nunzilla", "Gweninatrix", and "CinderGwennie", and commented that "your speakers have a mute setting for good reason."

Track listings
 UK, European, and Australian 2-track CD single
"Wind It Up" (Main Mix) – 3:11
"Wind It Up" (Original Neptunes Mix) – 3:08

 European CD maxi single
"Wind It Up" (Main Mix) – 3:11
"Wind It Up" (Original Neptunes Mix) – 3:08
"Wind It Up" (Original Neptunes Mix Instrumental) – 3:08
"Wind It Up" (video) – 3:11

 UK 12-inch single
A1. "Wind It Up" (Main Mix) – 3:11
A2. "Wind It Up" (Original Neptunes Mix) – 3:08
B1. "Wind It Up" (Main Mix Instrumental) – 3:11
B2. "Wind It Up" (Original Neptunes Mix Instrumental) – 3:10

Credits and personnel
Credits are adapted from the liner notes of The Sweet Escape.

 Gwen Stefani – lead vocals, songwriting
 Pete Davis – additional keyboards, additional mix programming
 Alex Dromgoole – assistant engineering
 David Emery – assistant engineering
 Ron Fair – orchestra production
 Brian "Big Bass" Gardner – mastering

 Brian Garten – recording
 Hart Gunther – assistant engineering
 The Neptunes – production
 Mark "Spike" Stent – additional production, mixing
 Talent Bootcamp Kids – additional vocals
 Pharrell Williams – songwriting

Charts

Weekly charts

Year-end charts

Certifications

Release history

References

2006 singles
2006 songs
American hip hop songs
Gwen Stefani songs
Interscope Records singles
Music videos directed by Sophie Muller
Number-one singles in New Zealand
Song recordings produced by the Neptunes
Songs with feminist themes
Songs with lyrics by Oscar Hammerstein II
Songs with music by Richard Rodgers
Songs written by Gwen Stefani
Songs written by Pharrell Williams
The Sound of Music